Electric Sun was a rock band formed by Uli Jon Roth after his departure from the Scorpions in 1978. They recorded three albums between 1979 and 1985.

Their first album, Earthquake, was released in 1979 and features guitarist/vocalist Roth, bassist Ule Ritgen and drummer Clive Edwards. Edwards departed shortly after recording the first album.

Fire Wind came next in 1981, featuring new drummer Sidhatta Gautama. The band toured for a few years afterwards. While the first two albums were a trio format, the third album was more of an ensemble project. Veteran drummer Clive Bunker, formerly of Jethro Tull, appeared, as did Ritgen, vocalist Michael Flexig and guest vocalist Nicky Moore, as well as an array of additional various singers and orchestral musicians. Another feature of the album was the invention of Roth's Sky Guitar. In 1983, drummer and percussionist Simon Fox worked alongside Clive Bunker.

The name Electric Sun was retired in 1986, and Uli Jon Roth continued to pursue classical-inspired rock, and a focus on other artistic areas, under his own name.

Discography

References

German heavy metal musical groups
Musical groups established in 1978
Musical groups disestablished in 1986
1978 establishments in West Germany
1986 disestablishments in West Germany
Brain Records artists